Dariusz Sośnicki is a Polish poet. He was born in 1969 in Kalisz, and studied philosophy at the Adam Mickiewicz University. From 1994 to 1996, he edited the literary journal "Nowy Nurt" (New Current). In 2001 he attended the University of Iowa on a writer's grant. He has published numerous books and his work has been translated into English and Romanian, among other languages. He has also translated the work of WH Auden into Polish.

Works
 Marlewo, posł. Marcin Świetlicki, Pracownia, Ostrołęka 1994
 Ikarus, Pomona, Wrocław 1998
 Mężczyzna w dominie [arkusz], Centrum Sztuki – Teatr Dramatyczny, Legnica 1999
 Symetria, Biuro Literackie Port Legnica, Legnica 2002
 Skandynawskie lato, Biuro Literackie, Wrocław 2005
 Folia na wietrze. Wiersze z tomów Marlewo i Ikarus, Biuro Literackie, Wrocław 2007
 Państwo P., Biuro Literackie, Wrocław 2009
 O rzeczach i ludziach. Wiersze zebrane 1991-2010, Biuro Literackie, Wrocław 2011
 Spóźniony owoc radiofonizacji, Biuro Literackie, Wrocław 2014
 Wysokie ogniska. Wiersze wybrane. Wybór i posłowie Paweł Kaczmarski. WBPiCAK, Poznań 2014
Po domu, Biuro Literackie, Kołobrzeg 2021

In translation
 Familia P., Editura Tracus Arte & Casa de Editură Max Blecher, Bucureşti, Bistriţa 2011, przeł. Vasile Moga
 The World Shared, BOA Editions, Lannan Translations Selection Series, Rochester, NY 2014, przeł. Piotr Florczyk i Boris Dralyuk

References

Polish poets
1969 births
Living people
People from Kalisz